Serrana is a municipality in the state of São Paulo in Brazil. The population is 45,644 (2020 est.) in an area of 126 km2. The elevation is 427 m.

COVID-19 vaccine study 

While other communities were struggling to deal with the COVID-19 pandemic in Brazil, Serrana participated in a study wherein 100% of its adult population was supposed to be vaccinated with CoronaVac. Prior to the mass vaccination, 5% of Serrana's population had been infected, one of the highest rates in Brazil.

Most adults received two shots by the end of April. By May, symptomatic COVID-19 cases fell 80%, hospitalizations by 86%, and mortality by 95% according to researchers doing the study. The virus was contained once 75% of people were vaccinated.  According to Ricardo Palacios, a director at São Paulo's Instituto Butantan, "The most important result was understanding that we can control the pandemic even without vaccinating the entire population."

Notable people 
Renan Lodi (born 1998), professional footballer

References

Municipalities in São Paulo (state)